El Petit Encantat is a mountain peak of Catalonia, Spain. Located in the Pyrenees, it is the lower of the two peaks (the other being the Gran Encantat) of the Els Encantats mountain, with an altitude of 2,734 metres above sea level.

See also
Mountains of Catalonia

References

Mountains of Catalonia
Mountains of the Pyrenees